Chernigovsky District is an administrative and municipal district (raion), one of the twenty-two in Primorsky Krai, Russia. It is located in the southwest of the krai. Its administrative center is the rural locality (a selo) of Chernigovka. Population:  The population of Chernigovka accounts for 36.0% of the district's total population.

Notable residents 

Denis Kniga (born 1992 in Chernigovka), football player

References

Notes

Sources

Districts of Primorsky Krai